Makakilo or Makakilo City is a census-designated place and residential area located in the Ewa District on the island of Oahu in the City & County of Honolulu, United States. In Hawaiian, maka kilo means "observing eyes". As of the 2020 census, the CDP had a population of 19,877.

Geography 

Makakilo is located at  (21.352850, -158.090732) on the southern end of the slopes of the Waianae mountain range above the city of Kapolei. The Interstate H-1 freeway divides more recently developed Kapolei from Makakilo, and traveling eastward on H-1 connects to Waipahu. Exit 1 on H-1 is Kalaeloa Road, the entrance to Barbers Point and Campbell Industrial Park.

Demographics 

As of the census of 2000, there were 13,156 people, 3,898 households, and 3,223 families in the CDP. The racial makeup of the CDP was 24.16% White, 2.53% Black or African American, 0.20% Native American, 32.08% Asian, 10.20% Pacific Islander, 1.51% from other races, and 29.32% from two or more races.  10.09% of the population were Hispanic or Latino of any race.

Of the 3,898 households 44.2% had children under the age of 18 living with them, 65.9% were married couples living together, 11.3% had a female householder with no husband present, and 17.3% were non-families. 11.3% of households were one person and 1.4% were one person aged 65 or older.  The average household size was 3.37 and the average family size was 3.64.

The age distribution was 30.5% under the age of 18, 8.4% from 18 to 24, 33.6% from 25 to 44, 21.5% from 45 to 64, and 6.1% 65 or older.  The median age was 32 years.  For every 100 females, there were 101.0 males.  For every 100 females age 18 and over, there were 98.5 males.

The median household income was $66,515 and the median family income  was $67,267. Males had a median income of $40,067 versus $31,194 for females. The per capita income for the CDP was $20,945.  5.1% of the population and 4.3% of families were below the poverty line.  Out of the total population, 7.1% of those under the age of 18 and 3.6% of those 65 and older were living below the poverty line.

Education
Hawaii Department of Education operates two public elementary schools in the CDP: Makakilo Elementary School and Mauka Lani Elementary School.

Recreation
Wet'n'Wild Hawaii was defined in the Makakilo City CDP in the 2000 U.S. Census but for the 2010 U.S. Census was redefined as being in Kapolei CDP.

References

Census-designated places in Honolulu County, Hawaii
Populated places on Oahu